Androctonus amoreuxi, the African fattail scorpion, is a species of scorpion found in Africa. In the Dogon Country of Mali, it is a common house scorpion.

References

Buthidae
Scorpions of Africa
Animals described in 1826